Blaydon is a railway station on the Tyne Valley Line, which runs between  and  via . It is owned by Network Rail and managed by Northern Trains.

History
The Newcastle and Carlisle Railway was formed in 1829, and was opened in stages. Initially serving as the line's eastern terminus, through services to Redheugh began in March 1837.

It was not until January 1851 that Newcastle Central would be accessible using this route.

This line closed to passengers in the 1950s, before fully closing in November 1963.

Blaydon was substantially rebuilt in 1912, with new red brick station buildings and glass canopies. In 1969, the station became an unstaffed halt, and the canopies were removed. The station buildings were demolished in 1977, due to neglect and persistent vandalism.  Service levels were also infrequent for many years, with only a small number of services calling at peak times.  Since 2013 however, the timetable has been upgraded and more trains now call (with a consequent improvement in usage, as can be seen in the statistics)

Services over Scotswood Bridge were withdrawn on 4 October 1982, with the line re-routed through Dunston and across the King Edward VII Bridge, using part of the original 1837 route, which had since only been used by freight. Few traces of the former line now remain, though the position of the station signal box gives a clue as to the old alignment.

Facilities
The station has two platforms, both of which have a ticket machine (which accepts card or contactless payment only), seating, waiting shelter, next train audio and visual displays and an emergency help point. There is step-free access to both platforms, with platforms also linked by a footbridge. There is a small car park and cycle storage at the station.

Blaydon is part of the Northern Trains penalty fare network, meaning that a valid ticket or promise to pay notice is required prior to boarding the train.

Services

All services are operated by Northern Trains.

Rolling stock used: Class 156 Super Sprinter and Class 158 Express Sprinter

References

External links 
 
 

Railway stations in Tyne and Wear
DfT Category F2 stations
Former North Eastern Railway (UK) stations
Railway stations in Great Britain opened in 1835
Railway stations in Great Britain closed in 1966
Railway stations in Great Britain opened in 1967
Northern franchise railway stations